Hellinsia emmelinoida is a moth of the family Pterophoroidea. It is found in Tanzania. The species closely resembles the European Emmelina monodactyla.

The wingspan is 22–24 mm. The moth flies in January, July and December.

External links
Ten new species of Afrotropical Pterophoridae (Lepidoptera)

Endemic fauna of Tanzania
emmelinoida
Moths of Africa
Insects of Tanzania
Moths described in 2008
Taxa named by Cees Gielis